Sveti Ivan may refer to:
 Sveti Ivan Rilski or Saint John of Rila (876–c. 946), Bulgarian hermit
 Sveti Ivan Žabno, a municipality in Koprivnica-Križevci County, Croatia
 Sveti Ivan Zelina, a town in Zagreb county, Croatia
 Sveti Ivan, Buzet, a village near Buzet, Istria County, Croatia
 Sveti Ivan, Višnjan, a village near Višnjan, Istria County, Croatia

See also
 Saint John (disambiguation)